Dragon Slayer Ornstein and Executioner Smough, or simply Ornstein and Smough, are a duo of interconnected characters from the 2011 action role-playing game Dark Souls. Independently known as Dragon Slayer Ornstein and Executioner Smough, they are mentioned in the lore of every game in the series, but are predominantly known for their appearance as an asymmetrical boss fight considered one of the game's most difficult. Ornstein being one of the Four Knights of Gwyn who formerly hunted dragons, and Smough an executioner of superhuman size, they were assigned to protect the Lordvessel from intruders and function as the final bosses of the Anor Londo level. The boss battle has been called one of the most memorable fights in gaming by critics.

Characteristics 
Ornstein and Smough possess vastly different physical traits. Ornstein is slightly larger than human-sized, extremely fast and wields a spear, while Smough is several times taller than a human, wields a tremendous hammer, and walks slowly unless he is charging. Both of them wear golden armor which emphasizes their height - Ornstein's helmet is leonine with a hole in the mouth, while Smough's armor distorts his muscular body into an obese figure with a cherub-like face, although he sees out of the neck.

Both of the characters are fought in a long, rectangular and empty cathedral, with parallel sets of pillars on either side. The player can either attempt to block Smough with the pillars while attacking Ornstein, or attack Smough while dodging Ornstein, a more difficult task when alone. If Ornstein is defeated first, Smough crushes him with his hammer, and gains the power of lightning. If Smough is defeated first, Ornstein suddenly grows to immense size while retaining his former speed. When the second boss is defeated, the player can purchase the armor of that boss, and in Ornstein's case, obtains the Leo Ring.

A boss identical to Ornstein appears in Dark Souls II, called the "Old Dragonslayer", although this fight has been criticized as a "carbon copy" that lacked creativity. Ornstein's spear can be created from the soul of the Old Dragonslayer, and the boss drops the Old Leo Ring, though no other items related to the duo appear in Dark Souls II. The armor and weapons of both Ornstein and Smough, as well as the Leo Ring, return as usable equipment in Dark Souls III.

Fictional biography 
Dragon Slayer Ornstein is a member of the Four Knights of Gwyn, an elite personal guard to Lord Gwyn, the primary god of the Dark Souls universe. Loyal to Gwyn since the dawn of the Age of Fire, he has an elemental affinity with lightning, which he used to slay dragons using his cross spear weapon. He shows respect for Smough, calmly absorbing his soul if Smough is defeated.

Executioner Smough is an indiscriminate executioner with immense physical strength, though his psychological instability and cannibalistic tendencies prevented him from ever being truly inducted into the Knights of Gwyn. Smough is also disliked by Kingseeker Frampt, a primordial serpent and close friend of Lord Gwyn, who only offers a single soul in exchange for feeding him the Soul of Smough.

When the gods fled Anor Londo, both warriors saw it as an immense honor to guard Gwynevere, daughter of Lord Gwyn and Queen of Sunlight, unaware of the fact that she was an illusion.

Development 
The name of Dragon Slayer Ornstein was likely based on the composer Leo Ornstein. Smough's armor was designed to appear as though it was created by a demented person, reflecting his personality, and he was designed first, with Ornstein being introduced much later in development. Creator Hidetaka Miyazaki forced the game's designers and programmers to make Smough's armor a player-equippable reward, making them "really angry".

Alex Wiltshire of Kotaku noted that Smough suffers from a bug to his weapon's hitbox, in which his weapon can still deal damage after the mid-boss cutscene starts and Smough moves to a different location, which has resulted in the deaths of the characters of speedrunners. The bug went unfixed in Dark Souls Remastered.

Reception 
Several critics consider the Ornstein and Smough encounter to be one of the most memorable and significant boss fights in video games. IGN staff ranked it number 15 in their list of the most unforgettable video game moments of all time, with Chiloi Rad calling it the "singularly defining encounter in the whole of the first Dark Souls". Chris Carter of Destructoid concurred, noting he was not initially prepared for the challenge and was forced to retreat after he realized that Ornstein became larger upon Smough's defeat, eventually prevailing over the bosses in the reverse order after a "soul draining" encounter. GamesRadar+ called the fight the third best in the entire Dark Souls series, behind Sif and Knight Artorias, stating that it induced a "roller coaster of emotions" that was "the Dark Souls experience distilled into one fight". Joe Donnelly of PC Gamer also called the duo one of the best Dark Souls bosses, and "one of the series' most epic showdowns", adding that "my own inability to topple them keeps me coming back for more".

Dave Cook of VG247 called the "feeling of jubilation" when he beat Ornstein and Smough "unmatched in all my years as a gamer", also praising the Dark Souls community for helping him to defeat the bosses. Mark Serrels of Kotaku called the fight "perhaps the most notorious boss battle in Dark Souls", and stated that he felt "pure zen" when he beat it, confident that he was going to win after many repeated attempts. Matthew Byrd of Den of Geek stated that the difficulty of fighting the bosses makes the player question why they must "suffer through a trial that has so clearly been designed to make you overcome unfair odds", saying that they are especially representative of the core appeal of Dark Souls. Derek Swinhart of Game Informer noted that Ornstein and Smough "have become referenced far outside of their origins", adding that the fight "remains challenging and incredibly satisfying years later, and even veteran players can't let their guard down".

Dragonslayer Ornstein was modded into Darkest Dungeon as a playable character by a fan.

Unusual control methods 
Players have beaten Ornstein and Smough using many non-standard control devices, including a Rock Band guitar and drum controller, a Donkey Konga bongo drum controller, and a voice control. Separately, Twitch Plays Dark Souls beat the bosses after 28 days, using a voting-based system for the stream's viewers to choose controller inputs.

References 

Fictional knights in video games
Video game characters introduced in 2011
Video game bosses
Male characters in video games
Fictional executioners
Fictional duos
Fictional hammer fighters
Fictional polearm and spearfighters
Fantasy video game characters
Video game characters with electric or magnetic abilities
Video game characters who use magic
Fictional characters who can change size
Video game characters with superhuman strength
Dark Souls
Fictional dragonslayers